Mackie's of Scotland is a Scottish ice cream and confectionery manufacturer based in Rothienorman, Aberdeenshire, Scotland. It was founded in 1912 as a dairy farm but diversified into the manufacture of ice cream in 1986, before selling the milk retail business to Robert Wiseman during 1997. In 2009 a partnership was formed with a Tayside potato farming family, the Taylors, to produce crisps, marketed under the name of Mackie's at Taypack. In 2022, the Taylor family purchased Mackie's shares in the crisp business. The manufacture of chocolate on the Mackie farm in Aberdeenshire began in 2014. Mackie's of Scotland is a real living wage employer.

Ice cream 
Mackie's of Scotland makes all of its ice cream on the family farm in Aberdeenshire using fresh, whole milk. The farm holds 330 cows and produces over 10 million litres of ice cream a year. A range of flavours are available in the Classic range, including: Traditional, Honeycomb, Chocolate, Organic and Raspberry Ripple. In the Indulgent range are: Salted Caramel, Madagascan Vanilla and Chocolate Orange & Honeycomb. Mackie's first began ice cream production in 1986.

Mackie's of Scotland is best known for its Traditional flavour ice cream, which is Scotland's best selling ice cream.

Chocolate 
Mackie's of Scotland has been manufacturing chocolate on the farm since 2014, producing five flavours inspired by the flavours of its ice cream range: Traditional, Honeycomb, Orange, Dark and Mint.

Renewable energy initiatives 
Mackie's of Scotland was an early adopter of renewable energy, installing its first 850kW turbine in 2005, having first trialled the idea with a smaller grid-connected turbine as far back as 1983. The firm produces more than twice as much energy as it uses, feeding the excess energy back to the UK grid. The farm's main source of renewable energy is wind, with four wind turbines producing a total capacity of 3 MW. Annually, the wind turbines generate 8570 MWh on average, which is roughly equivalent to the amount of energy required to power over 2000 UK homes.

The farm also boasts a 10-acre site of solar panels with a capacity of 1.8 MW, a smaller array of solar panels on the byre roof and a biomass plant which produces a further 400 kW of heating power for the farm's office and houses. The solar panels help to complement the wind energy harvested by the farm, particularly in the sunnier summer months of the year when it is less windy.

Between 2021 and 2022, Mackie's of Scotland has installed a low-carbon refrigeration system which uses the heat from a biomass boiler to be help freeze the ice cream made on site. The new system will use biomass heat and ammonia, a natural refrigerant gas with no climate warming threat to cool the ice cream.

Ice cream parlour 
In 2017, the company opened its first ice cream parlour, Mackies 19.2, in Marischal Square, Aberdeen. The parlour is named for its being located 19.2 miles from the family farm.

References

External links 
 Company website
 Chocolate website
 Crisps website

Scottish brands
Food manufacturers of Scotland
Food and drink companies of Scotland
Food and drink companies established in 1912
1912 establishments in Scotland